Jackson is a rural town and locality in the Maranoa Region, Queensland, Australia.

The town's economy was based on the rail industry.

Geography 
The Warrego Highway runs through from east to west. 

The Western Railway Line also runs through from east to west, with the town historically served by the now-abandoned Jackson railway station.

History 

The town is named after John Woodward Wyndham Jackson, who was a sawmiller at Channing (an area now within Jackson South) around 1887 and who later became the police magistrate at Mackay.

Jackson Post Office opened by July 1908 (a receiving office had been open from 1887) and closed in 1988.

Jackson Provisional School opened on 18 January 1892. On 1 January 1909, it became Jackson State School.  It closed on 9 December 1983 after 91 years of service. It was at 23 Edward Street.

In 2002, local resident Ella Robinson petitioned the former Bendemere Shire Council to have Jackson State School's play shed, built in 1908, relocated from the former school site (which had laid dormant since the School's closure in 1983) to the centre of town at the old railway station site to serve as a Intercity Bus Stop (ICBS) for passengers travelling on Greyhound Australia's long-distance coach services. In 2012, numerous information panels were installed in the old play shed illustrating the town's history and paying tribute to the pioneers who helped establish the rural community.  A crowd of 120 attended a ceremony on 10 November 2012 to see then - Federal Member for Maranoa Bruce Scott officially unveil the new panels in what is now known as Jackson's "Tribute to Pioneers". Tourism bodies now mention The Old Play Shed in promotional material as one of the interesting sights to see in Jackson. 

Facilities 
The Jackson Branch Library is situated in Edward Street. It is operated by the Maranoa Regional Council through the Rural Libraries Queensland service provided by the State Library of Queensland. it also provides a High Speed ISDN Internet Connection to Brisbane (powered through the National Broadband Network).

Education 
There are no schools in Jackson. The nearest primary schools are in Dulacca and Yuleba. The nearest secondary school is in Wallumbilla, but that school only provides education to Year 10. For Years 11 and 12, the nearest secondary schools are in Miles and Roma.

References

External links 

 

Towns in Queensland
Maranoa Region
Localities in Queensland